The settlement of Harington Point (often incorrectly spelt Harrington Point) lies within the boundaries of the city of Dunedin, New Zealand.  It is located at the Otago Heads, at the northeastern end of Otago Peninsula, close to the entrance of Otago Harbour. The mouth of the harbour is at its narrowest at Harington Point, only some 400 metres separating the point from the mudflats at Aramoana on the opposing coast.

Harington Point is located between Taiaroa Head, the site of the only mainland royal albatross colony in the world, and Te Rauone beach, historically known for its many sand dunes which have eroded.

The settlement can be reached via a 45-minute drive from Dunedin City on sealed roads, and is also serviced 7 days per week by a regular bus service taking 60 minutes from the city center, as well as a school bus.

Despite its small size, Harington Point offers accommodation ranging from holiday houses to self-contained motel units.

Wildlife
The settlement of Harington Point is the closest residential area to the albatross colony, as well as several other regionally important wildlife colonies.  Between Harington Point and Taiaroa Head is Pilot's Beach, where little blue penguins are seen returning to nest at dusk.  Over the hills southwest of Harington Point is the "Penguin Place Conservation Reserve", a nesting colony of yellow-eyed penguins.

All three offer public tours of the respective wildlife colonies.  Wellers Rock wharf, just south of Harington Point, is the base for boat cruises and tours exploring the sea and bird life in the area.

History

Wellers Rock
It is named in honour of the Weller Brothers, a family of whalers who formed one of the first permanent European settlements in the southern South Island. The Wellers operated three stations within Otago Harbour, the most important of which was the Otakou station, located near Harington Point. One of the largest shore whaling stations in New Zealand at the time, it operated from 1831 to 1841. An archaeological excavation of part of the site was carried out by the University of Otago in 1991.

In January 2020 Te Runanga o Otakou, the Dunedin City Council, and the Department of Conservation joined forces in a project to protect the site from degradation.

Gun emplacements
The hills behind Harington Point contain several abandoned World War II gun emplacements, a subterranean communications tunnel and bunker, which were all part of the coastal fortifications of New Zealand.

Demographics

References

Populated places in Otago
Otago Peninsula
Forts in New Zealand
Suburbs of Dunedin